is a weapons-based fighting game developed by Tamsoft and published by Takara and Sony Computer Entertainment in 1995 for the PlayStation, followed by 1996 ports for the Sega Saturn, Game Boy and MS-DOS. It was one of the first fighting games, after Virtua Fighter in 1993 on arcade and console, to boast polygonal characters in a 3D environment, and features a sidestep maneuver which is credited for taking the genre into "true 3D." The Game Boy version of Battle Arena Toshiden despite sharing the same name as the console & PC counterparts is a different game. It is a 2D weapons based fighter and supports the Super Game Boy cartridge peripheral for the Super Nintendo Entertainment System/Super Famicom to allow the game to be played on a TV with colour palettes and borders.

The game was announced as a PlayStation exclusive, with Sony initially promoting it as a "Saturn killer" (against Sega's Virtua Fighter), but it was ported to the Saturn with additional features less than a year later. After fighting games like Tekken started emerging, Battle Arena Toshinden declined in popularity, but still spawned a series of sequels, starting with Battle Arena Toshinden 2. Battle Arena Toshinden was the first 3D weapons fighter, and was succeeded in spirit by Soul Edge and other games of the genre.

Gameplay
Each character has his or her own unique set of basic moves, special attacks, and a desperation attack that can only be used when the player has low energy (around 10% or less). The player can move in 3D around the 3D arenas using the L/R shoulder buttons, which can be used to dodge projectile attacks or get away from a dangerous spot.

Players move using the directional pad. Holding the backward directional button allows the player to block basic attacks and reduces most of the damage from opponents' special moves. Players can also run by quickly tapping the forward directional button.

As with other games of the genre, the player wins by depleting the opposing players health, having more health than their opponent if the time runs out, or knocking their opponent out of the non-walled arena. Unlike many fighting games of the time, it was possible for a player character to accidentally fall off the arena with a miss-timed run or special move, resulting in some unique tactics.

Plot
Throughout the criminal underworld, announcements of a famed underworld tournament reemerging after a long hiatus has made word throughout the globe. Known as the Battle Arena Toshinden, this underworld tournament is a weapons fighting tournament broadcast as bloodsport entertainment for an elite and interested audience. Hosted by a mysterious organization known only as the Secret Society, believed to be related to a world leading multinational megaconglomerate, the Gerard Foundation, the Secret Society has picked eight worthy challengers from around the world to pit against each other for the chance at a prize for fortune, fame, and glory.

A young Japanese swordsman/adventurer named Eiji Shinjo, who has spent the past few years searching for his long-lost older brother, Sho, enters the legendary Battle Arena Toshinden tournament  along with seven other traveling fighters, the fighters themselves being Eiji's best friend/rival, Kayin Amoh, a Scottish bounty hunter who seeks revenge against the previous tournament champion for the death of his foster father; Sofia, an amnesiac Russian private detective who is seeking her long-lost memories; Rungo Iron, an American miner who is determined to rescue his kidnapped family from the Secret Society; Fo Fai, a Chinese magician/serial killer who enters the tournament in order to satisfy his personal bloodlust; Mondo, a Japanese ninja who is undertaking an infiltration mission for a rival group of the Secret Society; Duke B. Rambert, a French knight seeking revenge against Eiji for a past defeat; and Ellis, a cheerful and kind-hearted orphaned dancer who is seeking personal answers regarding her long-lost missing father.

Eiji progresses through the tournament and ultimately comes face-to-face with the tournament's sponsor, the mysterious Gaia and even though Eiji manages to hold his own against Gaia from within their final battle against each other, the match is unexpectedly halted when it is soon discovered that Gaia is holding the competition without the Secret Society's permission, with the intention of acquiring fighters in order to help him overthrow the organization as a part of his vendetta against them. Gaia is forced to flee into hiding while leaving Eiji no closer to finding his long-lost older brother.

Characters
Initially playable characters:
 Eiji Shinjo - The main protagonist of the series. A young Japanese traveling swordsman/adventurer who seeks to find his long-lost older brother, Sho.
 Kayin Amoh - A Scottish (later retconned as English) swordsman/bounty hunter who happens to be a friend and rival of Eiji. He seeks to avenge the death of his foster father, who was killed by the previous tournament's champion from last year.
 Sofia - A whip-wielding blonde Russian woman who works as a private detective. She seeks to find and recover her long-lost memories.
 Rungo Iron - A strong yet kind-hearted miner who seeks to rescue his wife Lila and his son Christopher from the Secret Society.
 Fo Fai - An elderly Chinese magician who is secretly a cold-hearted serial killer. Fo Fai enters the tournament to satisfy his bloodlust.
 Mondo - An emotionless Japanese ninja warrior who infiltrates the tournament under the orders from a rival group of the Secret Society.
 Duke B. Rambert - An arrogant French knight who seeks to find and defeat Eiji to avenge a past loss to him.
 Ellis - A cheerful and kind-hearted orphaned dancer of a traveling theater troupe who seeks to discover whether or not her long-lost missing father is still alive.

Unlockable characters:
 Gaia - The sponsor of the tournament and boss of the game. His reasons for holding the tournament in the first place are shrouded in mystery. He is later revealed to be the father of Ellis.
 Sho Shinjo - The secret final boss of the game, reached by clearing the game without continues. The champion from last year's previous tournament and Eiji's older brother, he is a merciless swordsman who holds nothing back from within the fights that he participates in. His soundtrack is a variation of Toccata and Fugue in D minor, BWV 565.
 Cupido (Sega Saturn version) - A mysterious woman who speaks with cryptic riddles and messages. Her past is shrouded in mystery, and not much is known about her. She is the "true" final boss in this version.
 Uranus (Game Boy version)
 Earthworm Jim (PC version) - A guest character who happens to be the main protagonist from his self-named series. His attacks are identical to those of Rungo Iron.

Release
The original PlayStation version developed by Tamsoft. Inspired by Virtua Fighter, they showcased it to Sony, who was impressed by this. At E3 1995, Sony announced it as a PlayStation exclusive and was promoted as a "Saturn killer" to be a rival to the Sega Saturn. It was ported by Nextech/Sega to the Sega Saturn as Toh Shin Den S in Japan and as Battle Arena Toshinden Remix in the United States and Europe. A few new features were added, including an exclusive new character named Cupido and a story mode which enables the player to learn a few details about the characters' story backgrounds and the reasons of why they had entered into the tournament. Work on the Saturn port began while the PlayStation original was still in development.

Developed by Digital Dialect, the DOS port of the PlayStation version added an exclusive new character, Earthworm Jim, complete with his unique arena music, but he only uses the moves of Rungo Iron. It also supports resolutions up to 640x480. The PC port uses the Japanese PlayStation version's voices and music in all regions, unlike the original PlayStation version.

The game was also ported to the Game Boy by Takara in 1996, titled Nettou Toshinden in Japan. The game is based mostly on the original PlayStation version, but it includes a slightly altered story mode and an early appearance of the character Uranus and the Battle Arena Toshinden 2 version of Gaia (without his armor).
The game was re-released in 2018 on the PlayStation Classic.

Reception

Sales
In Japan, Battle Arena Toshinden sold 696,851 units for the PlayStation. Upon the PlayStation's launch in the United States, Toshinden sold out in its first week on sale. The game went on to sell  units for the PlayStation in the United States, including 327,412 standalone copies and 205,312 bundled copies. Battle Arena Toshinden was included in the Greatest Hits range for having sold more than 150,000 units in the United States. The PlayStation version sold a total of  units in Japan and the United States.

According to Next Generation, the Saturn release had "disappointing sales" in Japan, which they attributed to the strong association of the game with the PlayStation (due to the use of the character Ellis in Japanese ads for the PlayStation) and its weak use of the Saturn hardware when compared to Virtua Fighter 2. Battle Arena Toshinden Remix for the Saturn sold 84,231 units in Japan, bringing combined sales of the PlayStation and Saturn versions to at least  units sold in Japan and the United States.

Contemporary reviews
Battle Arena Toshinden was critically acclaimed when released. Electric Playground gave the game a perfect score of 10 out of 10 in 1995. On release, Famicom Tsūshin scored the PlayStation version of the game a 30 out of 40, and gave it first a 9 out of 10 and later a 10 out of 10 in their Reader Cross Review. In an early 1995 interview, when asked which PlayStation game he was most impressed with so far, Ken Kutaragi answered Battle Arena Toshinden.

GamePro reviewed the Japanese version of the game in early 1995 (prior to the PlayStation's launch in the U.S.). They remarked that the game is very impressive, and superior to Virtua Fighter in some aspects, but also flawed in several respects. They particularly praised the texture-mapped polygon graphics, original fighters, myriad moves, unique style of play, and the sidestep move, commenting that "the only problem with this slick defensive move is that from some viewing angles, the fighters obstruct the front of the screen, making it impossible to see where a move is coming from". Their review of the later U.S. release was also generally positive; they praised the graphics, stage design, playability, and dynamic camera, but criticized the game for being simplistic and easy, remarking that "this game relies more on flash than fighting". They summarized the game as "an enjoyable fight". Next Generation also reviewed the game prior to the PlayStation's U.S. launch. They commented that while the gameplay lacks originality and good reaction speed, the 3D aesthetics and graphics make it a much more powerful experience to play than a typical 2D fighter. However, they concluded that the game loses "by a hair" when compared to its rival, Virtua Fighter. On the other hand, Hyper magazine rated Toshinden higher than Virtua Fighter.

The four reviewers of Electronic Gaming Monthly gave the game a positive review, chiefly praising the character design, graphics, and special moves. Battle Arena Toshinden was awarded Best Fighting Game of 1995 by Electronic Gaming Monthly.

Maximum made note of the graphical and gameplay innovations such as gouraud shading, rotational backgrounds, dramatic camera angles, and the sidestep. They however remarked that the poor quality directional pad on the original PlayStation controller "just isn't built for taking diagonals and quarter circle rolls", making it irritatingly difficult to pull off special moves. Though they assessed the game as good overall, they advised gamers to instead hold out for the PlayStation port of Tekken, which they felt to be far superior in every respect. Dragon gave the game 3 out of 5 stars.

Ports and retrospective reviews

Later reviews from 1996 onwards, for later ports as well as retrospective reviews of the PlayStation version, have been generally mixed. In 1996, IGN gave the game a score of 7 out of 10, by which time it was seen as slow and "not as impressive" as the more recent Tekken 2, though they praised Toshinden for important innovations to the fighting game genre, such as taking "the fighter into true 3-D" and "one little move" that "changed the fighter forever" with the introduction of sidestep movement.

The Sega Saturn version was not as well-received as the PlayStation original. The four reviewers of Electronic Gaming Monthly complained of the fact that the graphics were not improved from the PlayStation version, and felt that the game was overshadowed by the recent release of Battle Arena Toshinden 2. While Rob Allsetter of Sega Saturn Magazine greatly praised the visuals of the game and judged the button configuration to be superior to that of the PlayStation version, he criticized the "slow" gameplay and the limited variety of moves, concluding that Battle Arena Toshinden is "still decent enough, but ... lacks the speed and depth of its more illustrious successors". A reviewer for Next Generation said that the visuals of the Japanese release were not up to par with those of the PlayStation version, and advised Saturn owners to wait for the U.S. release in hopes that Sega of America would fix the graphical shortcomings. GamePro'''s Tommy Glide commented that there is not enough additional content in the Saturn version and the graphics do not look as smooth as the PlayStation version's, assessing it as overall "a poor conversion". Maximums Rich Leadbetter stated that it fails to recreate the graphical effects of the PlayStation original, which he opined were the only saving grace of an extremely dull game. He held the additional character and the PAL conversion's lack of borders to be its only advantages over the PlayStation version.

During the 200th issue leadup of Electronic Gaming Monthly in 2005, they ranked Battle Arena Toshinden as their single most overrated game. They explained that it "was 3D, it was flashy--Battle Arena Toshinden was exciting and new. But later Namco showed us what really could be done with 3D fighting on the PlayStation (Tekken, Soul Blade). (...) But is it actually good? Oh God, no".

Sequels and Reboot
During the late 1990s, the game was followed by three sequels, Battle Arena Toshinden 2, Battle Arena Toshinden 3, and Toshinden 4, as well as a spin-off game Battle Arena Nitoshinden. An anime adaptation of the same title was also released in 1996. Eiji appeared as a secret guest character in the Sega Saturn game D-Xhird, released by Takara in 1997.

A new  game was unveiled in Weekly Famitsu in 2008. It was developed by DreamFactory for the Wii and has no connection to the previous games' storyline. While previous Toshinden'' installments feature mainly weapons-based combat, the Wii title features hand-to-hand combat alongside the weapons-based battles. A total of 8 characters were unveiled in official illustrations. The game was released in Japan on December 10, 2009.

References

External links
Tamsoft page: BAT
Playmates Interactive Entertainment, Inc. page
Digital Dialect page

 
1995 video games
3D fighting games
Central Park Media
DOS games
Nintendo games
Game Boy games
Multiplayer and single-player video games
PlayStation (console) games
PlayStation Portable games
PlayStation 3 games
PlayStation Vita games
Sega Saturn games
Takara Tomy franchises
Takara video games
Tiger Electronics handheld games
Video game franchises
Video games developed in Japan
Video games with AI-versus-AI modes
Muay Thai video games
Video games adapted into television shows
Digital Dialect games